Tom Lehmann (born 4 December 1987, in Rostock) is a German rower. Along with Felix Drahotta he finished 4th in the men's coxless pair at the 2008 Summer Olympics.

External links 
 
 

1987 births
Living people
Rowers from Rostock
Rowers at the 2008 Summer Olympics
Olympic rowers of Germany
German male rowers